Elena Nekrasova (born 1964) is a Russian writer, filmmaker and contemporary artist. Exhibitions of her paintings took place in Ukraine, Russia, United States, Japan, Germany, Denmark, Poland and other paintings are in many museums and private collections.

Elena Nekrasovа creates documentary films and video art. Documentary series "Provincial museums of Russia" and other repeatedly demonstrated on many TV channels in Russia - Culture, TVC etc., has a prize of the festival Kinotavr, Moscow International Film Festival, etc.

Since 2005, she writes prose. In 2008 Elena Nekrasovа - finalist of the main Russian literary prize, Russian Booker with the novel "Schukinsk and Other Places". The author of the novels "Gil-Gul", "Schukinsk and Other Places", "Script Writer", "Malenkiye" and a collection of short stories "Three dogs of Ada".

In 2010-2012 she traveled around the world on a yacht. According to the video materials of this journey she made documentary series "From land to land".

References

1964 births
Living people
Writers from Odesa
Russian directors
Film people from Odesa
Date of birth missing (living people)